Laconicus (fl. 192 BC) was a Spartan of royal descent who appears as king of Sparta for a brief moment in the aftermath of the assassination of the tyrant Nabis in 192 BC. Little is known about him; even his name may not be correct.

Life 
The name Laconicus is dubious, as it is otherwise unattested in Sparta. The name is only found in the account of the Roman historian Livy, who may have made a mistake while reading the Greek historian Polybius, his main source for the events of 192. Polybius might have only mentioned a "Laconian boy", translated as a name by Livy ("Laconicus"). Other spellings have been suggested instead, such as Laonicus or Leonidas, but Alfred Bradford accepts it as several unusual names were given in Sparta at the time. Bradford furthermore suggests that Laconicus could have been a son of Lycurgus, Eurypontid king of Sparta between 219 and c.212.

Laconicus grew up under the rule of Nabis, king of Sparta since the death of Pelops (son of Lycurgus) in 212, and was raised with his sons. In 192, Nabis was murdered by a contingent of 1000 Aetolian allies led by Alexamenus, who were present in the city to help Nabis in his war against the Achaean League. The Spartans then massacred the Aetolians and appointed Laconicus as king. However, the strategos of the Achaean League Philopoemen took advantage of the crisis to enter Sparta and forced the city to join his League, thus marking the end of independent Sparta. The kingship was abolished and Sparta ruled by an oligarchy loyal to Philopoemen.

References

Bibliography

Ancient works 
 Titus Livius (Livy), Ab Urbe Condita Libri.

Modern works 
Alfred S. Bradford, A Prosopography of Lacedaemonians from the Death of Alexander the Great, 323 B. C., to the Sack of Sparta by Alaric, A. D. 396, Munich, Beck, 1977. 
John Briscoe, A Commentary on Livy: Books 34 - 37, Oxford, Clarendon Press, 1981. 
 Paul Cartledge & Antony Spawforth, Hellenistic and Roman Sparta, A tale of two cities, London and New York, Routledge, 2002 (originally published in 1989). 
Graham J. Shipley, The Early Hellenistic Peloponnese: Politics, Economies, and Networks 338-197 BC, Cambridge University Press, 2018. 

2nd-century BC Spartans
Rulers of Sparta
2nd-century BC rulers in Europe
Ancient child monarchs